Chhatrapati Shivaji Maharaj University is a private University  in Panvel, Navi Mumbai, Maharashtra, India, established under the Chhatrapati Shivaji Maharaj University Act, 2018. The university offers Degree, Diploma and Certificate programmes in various disciplines of Engineering, Architecture, Science, Life Science, Biotechnology, Pharmaceutical Science, Commerce, Management, Hospitality, Law, Liberal Arts, Humanities, Social Science, Education, Mass Media, Creative Arts, Film Studies and Fashion Technology etc.

References

External links
 

Private universities in India
Universities in Maharashtra
Educational institutions established in 2018
2018 establishments in Maharashtra